The 1930 Baylor Bears football team represented Baylor University in the Southwest Conference (SWC) during the 1930 college football season. In their fifth season under head coach Morley Jennings, the Bears compiled a 6–3–1 record (3–1–1 against conference opponents), finished in second place in the conference, and outscored opponents by a combined total of 205 to 80. They played their home games at Carroll Field in Waco, Texas. Barton "Botchey" Koch was the team captain.

Schedule

References

Baylor
Baylor Bears football seasons
Baylor Bears football